Sino-Tibetan relations may refer to: 
 Tibet under Yuan rule
 Tibet during the Ming dynasty, see Sino-Tibetan relations during the Ming dynasty
 Tibet under Qing rule
 Tibet during the Republic of China (1912–49), see Tibet (1912–51)
 Tibet under the People's Republic of China rule